Flávia Lopes Saraiva (born September 30, 1999) is a Brazilian artistic gymnast. She represented Brazil at the 2014 Summer Youth Olympics in Nanjing, the 2016 Summer Olympics in Rio, and the 2020 Summer Olympics in Tokyo.  She was part of the teams that won gold at the 2018 South American Games and bronze at the 2015 and 2019 Pan American Games.  Individually she is the 2014 Summer Youth Olympic floor exercise champion and is a multi-medalist at the Pan American Games, South American Games, and Pan American Championships.

Junior career

2013
Saraiva's first international competition was the Houston National Invitational, where she finished 10th in the all-around competition. In
December, she competed at the 2013 Gymnasiade in her own country and won gold medals in floor exercise, balance beam and silver with
her team and placed sixth on uneven bars.

2014
Saraiva started her 2014 season by competing at the WOGA Classic in Plano, Texas. She placed first on balance beam, second with her team and fifth in the all-around. In March, she competed at the Junior Pan American Championships, a qualifier meet for the Youth Olympic Games. There she had an outstanding meet, as she placed first in the all-around and on floor, second with the team and third on bars and beam. In August, she was crowned Brazilian National Junior Champion and added a bronze on beam to her medal haul. She replaced injured teammate Rebeca Andrade and competed at the 2014 Youth Summer Olympics. She had a great competition there, qualifying to the all-around and the beam and floor finals. She medaled on all of them, winning silver in the AA and beam and gold on floor.

Senior career

2015
Saraiva made her senior international debut at the FIG World Challenge Cup in São Paulo. She won the floor exercise and got the silver medal on balance beam behind China's Shang Chunsong.

At the Pan American Games, she took the bronze medal in the all-around behind Canada's Ellie Black and USA's Madison Desch. In the team competition, Brazil took bronze behind the USA and Canada.

2016
Saraiva represented Brazil at the 2016 Rio Olympic Games. She helped the team qualify 5th into the team finals and individually qualified in 19th and 3rd into the individual all-around and balance beam finals, respectively. In the team final, Brazil placed 8th. Although she had originally qualified to the all-around final, she was replaced by Jade Barbosa so she could focus on the beam final. In the balance beam final, Flavia was last to compete. After having several big wobbles, she placed 5th behind Marine Boyer of France (4th) and Simone Biles of the USA (3rd).

2017
In 2017 Saraiva competed at the City of Jesolo Trophy, where she helped Brazil finish second behind the United States. Individually she placed fifth in the all-around, second on balance beam behind Riley McCusker of the United States, and was co-champion on floor exercise alongside Abby Paulson of the United States.  In May she competed at the Koper Challenge Cup where she placed third on uneven bars behind Larisa Iordache of Romania and Ellie Black of Canada and placed fourth on balance beam and eighth on floor exercise after not being able to finish her routine due to an injury sustained during the balance beam final.  The following week she competed at the Osijek Challenge Cup where she won silver on floor exercise behind compatriot Thais Fidelis, bronze on balance beam behind Fidelis and Anastasia Ilyankova of Russia, and placed fourth on uneven bars.  In August Saraiva suffered from a spinal injury and was our the remainder of the season.

2018
In April, Saraiva competed at the City of Jesolo Trophy, where she helped Brazil win the silver medal behind Russia.  Individually she placed eighth in the all-around and second on floor exercise behind Emma Malabuyo of the United States.  The following month she competed at the 2018 South American Games where she helped Brazil win gold in the team final. Individually she placed second in the all-around behind Martina Dominici of Argentina and won gold on uneven bars and balance beam.  In June Saraiva placed fourth at the Brazilian Championships, finishing behind Daniele Hypólito, Jade Barbosa, and Thais Fidelis.  The following month she competed at the Brazilian Event Championships where she placed first on balance beam and second on floor exercise behind Fidelis.

In August, she was selected for the team to compete at the 2018 Pan American Championships alongside Jade Barbosa, Rebeca Andrade, Thais Fidelis, and Lorrane Oliveira. She won a silver with the Brazilian team and ones on floor exercise and beam. She also won a bronze in the all-around. She was later selected for the team to compete at the 2018 World Championships in Doha, Qatar. There she qualified for the individual all-around final in 10th place and the floor final in 5th. The Brazilian team qualified to the team final in 5th. After several mistakes on the uneven bars, Brazil finished in 7th place. After a fall on balance beam in the all-around final, she finished in 8th place. She placed fifth on floor exercise after she had a step out of bounds.

In November, Saraiva competed at the Arthur Gander Memorial in Chiasso, Switzerland, where she placed second in the three-event all-around behind Barbosa.  A few days later she competed at the Swiss Cup in Zürich alongside Arthur Mariano where they placed sixth in qualifications.  Saraiva ended the season competing at the Cottbus World Cup where she placed first on floor exercise and second on balance beam behind teammate Andrade.

2019
Saraiva began the season competing at the DTB Team Challenge in Stuttgart, Germany, where Brazil won the gold medal ahead of second-place Russia. Individually, she placed fourth in the all-around behind compatriot Rebeca Andrade, Russian Angelina Melnikova, and Eythora Thorsdottir of the Netherlands.  In June she competed at the Brazilian Championships where she placed second in the all-around behind Thais Fidelis, second on uneven bars behind Lorrane Oliveira, and first on balance beam.

In July, Saraiva was named to the team to compete at the Pan American Games alongside Jade Barbosa, Thais Fidelis, Lorrane Oliveira, and Carolyne Pedro. Together the team won bronze in the team final. Individually Saraiva won bronze in the all-around behind Ellie Black of Canada and Riley McCusker of the United States and won bronze on floor exercise behind Brooklyn Moors of Canada and Kara Eaker of the United States. She also placed fifth on balance beam after falling off the apparatus.

In October, Saraiva competed at the 2019 World Championships. Brazil finished in 14th place in team qualifications and did not advance to the team final or the 2020 Olympic Games. Saraiva, however, finished the all-around qualification in tenth place and therefore qualified as an individual to the 2020 Olympics in Tokyo. She also qualified for the balance beam and floor exercise event finals. During the all-around final, she finished in seventh place. During event finals, she finished sixth on balance beam and fourth on floor exercise.

2020
In July, Saraiva and numerous other Brazilian Olympic hopefuls traveled to Portugal as they were unable to resume training due to the COVID-19 pandemic in Brazil remaining unstable and gyms remaining closed.

2021
At the 2020 Olympic Games, Saraiva injured her ankle on her last tumbling pass on floor during qualifications, thus, performing only on floor and balance beam. However, the gymnast was able to qualify for the balance beam event final and, despite the injury, her routine led her to finish 7th.

2022
In July, Saraiva was named to the team for the 2022 Pan American Championships alongside Rebeca Andrade, Christal Bezerra, Lorrane Oliveira, Carolyne Pedro, and Júlia Soares. Together, they won gold in the team final. Individually, Saraiva won gold in the all-around final ahead of Lexi Zeiss and Skye Blakely, gold on balance beam and silver on floor exercise.  In September Saraiva competed at the Paris World Challenge Cup. She finished fifth on floor exercise.

Saraiva competed at the World Championships alongside Andrade, Pedro, Soares, and Oliveira.  During qualifications Saraiva suffered an ankle injury on vault but still managed to qualify to the all-around final in tenth place and the floor exercise final in first place.  During the team final Saraiva only competed on uneven bars and helped Brazil finish fourth as a team.  Due to the injury Saraiva withdrew from all individual finals.

Competitive history

References

External links 

 
 
 

1999 births
Living people
Sportspeople from Rio de Janeiro (city)
Brazilian female artistic gymnasts
Gymnasts at the 2014 Summer Youth Olympics
Gymnasts at the 2015 Pan American Games
Gymnasts at the 2019 Pan American Games
Gymnasts at the 2016 Summer Olympics
Olympic gymnasts of Brazil
Pan American Games bronze medalists for Brazil
Pan American Games medalists in gymnastics
South American Games gold medalists for Brazil
South American Games silver medalists for Brazil
South American Games medalists in gymnastics
Competitors at the 2018 South American Games
Youth Olympic gold medalists for Brazil
Medalists at the 2015 Pan American Games
Medalists at the 2019 Pan American Games
Gymnasts at the 2020 Summer Olympics
20th-century Brazilian women
21st-century Brazilian women